The 1999–2000 Cupa României was the 62nd edition of Romania's most prestigious football cup competition.

The title was won by Dinamo București against FC U Craiova.

Format
The competition is an annual knockout tournament.

First round proper matches are played on the ground of the lowest ranked team, then from the second round proper the matches are played on a neutral location.

If a match is drawn after 90 minutes, the game goes into extra time. If the match is still tied, the result is decided by penalty kicks.

In the semi-finals, each tie is played as a two legs.

From the first edition, the teams from Divizia A entered in competition in sixteen finals, rule which remained till today.

First round proper

|colspan=3 style="background-color:#97DEFF;"|21 September 1999

|-
|colspan=3 style="background-color:#97DEFF;"|22 September 1999

|}

Second round proper

|colspan=3 style="background-color:#97DEFF;"|12 October 1999

|-
|colspan=3 style="background-color:#97DEFF;"|13 October 1999

|}

Quarter-finals 

|colspan=3 style="background-color:#97DEFF;"|10 November 1999

|}

Semi-finals
The matches were played on 15 March and 12 April 2000.

||0–2||1–3
||2–0||1–2
|}

Final

References

External links
 romaniansoccer.ro
 Official site
 The Romanian Cup on the FRF's official site

Cupa României seasons
1999–2000 in Romanian football
Romania